Gerhardsen's Fourth Cabinet governed Norway between 25 September 1963 and 12 October 1965. The Labour Party cabinet was led by Einar Gerhardsen. It had the following composition:

Cabinet members

|}

State Secretaries

References
Einar Gerhardsens fjerde regjering 1963-1965 - Regjeringen.no

Notes

Gerhardsen 4
Gerhardsen 4
1963 establishments in Norway
1965 disestablishments in Norway
Cabinets established in 1963
Cabinets disestablished in 1965